William H. Daingerfield (1808–1878) was the one-hundred-and-sixth Mayor of San Antonio, Texas.

Early life
William H. Daingerfield was born in Alexandria, Virginia in 1808.

Daingerfield attended the University of Virginia from 1828–1829, before becoming a lawyer in Maryland. He was also a farmer in the state.

Texas politician
He was the one-hundred-and-sixth mayor of San Antonio, Texas (1838), a Texas Senator for Bexar County (1840–1842), Texas Secretary of the Treasury (1842–1844) and chargé d'affaires for the Republic of Texas in the Netherlands (1844–1845).

Later life
He moved to Washington D.C. in 1860 to again practice law. 18 years later, he died in Prince George's County, Maryland.

References

Mayors of San Antonio
University of Virginia alumni
1878 deaths
1808 births
Republic of Texas Senators
19th-century American politicians